The Lozova is a left tributary of the river Bârlădel in Romania. It flows into the Bârlădel in Braniștea.

References

Rivers of Romania
Rivers of Galați County